Lonie is a name. Notable people with the name include:

 Nathan Lonie, Australian Football League footballer
 Ryan Lonie, his twin brother and also an AFL footballer
 Murray Lonie, headed the Lonie Report, report into transportation in Victoria, Auatralia
 Lonie Paxton, a National Football League long snapper
 Iain Lonie (1932-1988), New Zealand poet

See also
 Loney (name)